The Dominica Freedom Party (DFP) is a conservative political party in Dominica. It shares much of the same socially and economically conservative principles as the Conservative Party in the UK. The party has been led by Bernard Hurtault since 2021.

History
The DFP was led by Dame Eugenia Charles from 1972 until 1995. She became Prime Minister in 1980 and served until her 1995 retirement. Following her resignation as party leader and the defeat of the DFP in the 1995 elections by the United Workers' Party, she was succeeded by Brian Alleyne.

In 1996, Charles Savarin became the leader of the DFP. He had presided over the continuing decline of the DFP following the 2000 general election. Despite this the party still holds a degree of influence due to its accommodation with the DLP government. Even after losing all its seats and the DLP winning enough seats to form a government on their own, the DLP leader and prime minister, Roosevelt Skerrit appointed Savarin as a senator and gave him the key post of foreign minister. Many members of the DFP have criticized Savarin for his continued support for their erstwhile foes, the DLP.

During the previous elections held on 31 January 2000, the party won two of the 21 popularly elected seats with 13.6% of votes cast. The party subsequently joined a coalition government with the Dominica Labour Party (DLP), with the DLP not having enough seats to form a government on their own.

The party lost all of its seats in the House of Assembly at 2005 general election, held on 5 May 2005. This was the first time since 1975 that the DFP was not elected in any seats. The party garnered 3.15% of votes cast.

However on 5 August 2007 a new executive was elected, with businessman Michael Astaphan being elected as Political Leader.

Leadership
Eugenia Charles, 1972-1995
Brian Alleyne, 1995-1996
Charles Savarin, 1996-2007
Michael Astaphan, 2007-2008
Judith Pestaina, 2008-2012
Michael Astaphan, 2012-2017
Kent Vital, 2017-2021
Bernard Hurtault, 2021-

International Affiliations
The Dominica Freedom Party is affiliated with the Caribbean Democrat Union and the International Democrat Union

Electoral history

House of Assembly elections

References 

Political parties in Dominica
Conservative parties
1960s establishments in Dominica